Winds of September is a 2008 Taiwanese film. Set in 1996 in Hsinchu, it focuses on a gang of teenage boys who drink, smoke and gamble, and the relationships between them. It broke a number of taboos in Taiwanese filmmaking, including showing the group skinny dipping.

Directed and co-written by Tom Lin Shu-yu, the film was praised for its good acting and realistic themes. It was screened at the 2008 Toronto International Film Festival, and the Tokyo International Film Festival in 2008.

Eric Tsang produced the Hong Kong adaptation, High Noon (2008), by Heiward Mak.

Cast
Rhydian Vaughan
Chang Chieh
Jennifer Chu
Wang Po-chieh
Lin Chi-tai
Nelson Shen
Mao Di
Teresa Daley
Eric Tsang
Lawrence Ko
Esther Liu as Hsieh Meng-lun
Jag Huang as Police officer

Awards
The film was awarded Best Film at the Asian New Talent Awards of the 11th Shanghai International Film Festival in June 2008. It was also nominated for the Grand Prize at the 10th Taipei Film Awards.

It won Best Original Screenplay at the 45th Golden Horse Awards.

See also
 Nudity in film (East Asian cinema since 1929)
You Are the Apple of My Eye (2011) — Taiwanese coming-of-age high school film in 1990s Taiwan loosely based on the director's life

References

 

2008 films
Films set in Taiwan
Taiwanese drama films
2008 drama films
2000s Mandarin-language films
Films directed by Tom Lin